Terunoumi Masato, also known as Daikikō Masato,  born Masato Hayashi (September 15, 1967 – June 6, 2009), was a sumo wrestler from Gobō, Wakayama, Japan. A former amateur champion, he made his professional debut in 1990. His highest rank was maegashira 15. He was the first wrestler in the six tournaments per year era to reach the top makuuchi division after spending just one tournament in the second highest jūryō division. After injury problems he retired in 1993, and died at the age of 41 in 2009.

Career
He had played an active role in national sumo competitions since junior high school, and was a junior high school yokozuna in the third grade. He was an amateur champion at Kinki University, and won the All Japan Gakusei Championship in his senior year. He made his professional debut in March 1990 as a makushita tsukedashi entrant. It had been thought that he would join Wakamatsu stable because of their connections to Kinki University, but instead he chose Musashigawa stable, run by ex-yokozuna Mienoumi, apparently because of their excellent weight-training facilities. In September 1990 he won the makushita division yūshō or championship with a perfect 7–0 record and was promoted to the jūryō division for the November 1990 tournament, becoming the first sekitori from Musashigawa stable. At this point he changed his shikona or fighting name from his own surname of Hayashi to Daikikō.  He won immediate promotion to the top makuuchi division after his jūryō debut, the first wrestler to do so since the establishment of the six tournaments a year system in 1958.  His 11–4 record also won him the jūryō championship. His achievement  was helped by the fact that the top division was expanded from 38 to 40 wrestlers for the January 1991 tournament. However he was restricted by a neck injury and it was to be his only tournament in the top division. He missed the July and September 1991 tournaments through injury, and was demoted back to the makushita division. He won promotion back to jūryō after winning his second makushita championship, again with a perfect 7–0 record. However, he lasted only one tournament in jūryō  before being demoted again. After the July 1992 tournament he dropped the Daikikō shikona and reverted to his own surname. After winning promotion to the jūryō division for the third time in January 1993 he adopted a new shikona of Terunoumi.

Retirement from sumo
He retired in May 1993 after demotion to the makushita division once again. He was replaced in the jūryō division by his stablemate Musōyama. After leaving sumo he worked in an office and later became a car mechanic. He died of a cerebral haemorrhage in 2009 at the age of 41.

Fighting style
Terunoumi was a yotsu-sumo wrestler, preferring grappling techniques. His favoured grip on the opponent's mawashi or belt was migi-yotsu, a left hand outside, right hand inside position. His favourite kimarite was yori kiri.

Career record

See also
List of sumo tournament second division champions
Glossary of sumo terms
List of past sumo wrestlers

References

1967 births
2009 deaths
Japanese sumo wrestlers
Sumo people from Wakayama Prefecture
People from Gobō, Wakayama